Sami Outalbali (born 19 March 1999) is a French actor. He rose to prominence for portraying Ilyes on the OCS drama series  (2016–2019) and gained international recognition for his role as Rahim in the Netflix comedy-drama series Sex Education (2020–2021). He is also known for his roles in the supernatural series Mortel (2019–2021) and the drama film A Tale of Love and Desire (2021).

Early life
Sami Outalbali was born in Poissy, Yvelines, on 19 March 1999. He has Moroccan and Guadeloupean ancestry. At the age of 3, he appeared in a Disney advertisement.

Career
Outalbali first appeared on screen in the France 3 television film Il faut sauver Saïd in 2006. In 2011, he played a minor role in the comedy film Les Tuche.

In 2018, he appeared in the first part of the Arte miniseries , created by Philippe Faucon. In 2019, he starred in Laurent Micheli's Lola and Benjamin Parent's . That same year, he also appeared in the Netflix supernatural series Mortel as a missing teenager called Reda, the older brother of Sofiane (Carl Malapa).

In 2019, he joined the cast of the second series of the Netflix comedy-drama Sex Education in a recurring role. On the show, which marks his English-speaking debut, he portrays Rahim Harrack, a French exchange student who becomes a love interest of Eric Effiong (Ncuti Gatwa). He also returned for the show's third series. In August 2020, he starred in the music video for the single "Coup de Blues/Soleil" by Bigflo & Oli.

In 2019, he was cast in Leyla Bouzid's romantic drama film A Tale of Love and Desire as Ahmad Ouannas, a young French man of Algerian origin, who experiences a sexual awakening after meeting a Tunisian woman. The film premiered in the International Critics' Week section of the 2021 Cannes Film Festival. For this role, Outalbali was nominated for Most Promising Actor at the 27th Lumières Awards and Most Promising Actor at the 47th César Awards.

In April 2022, he served as a member of the jury at the 5th Canneseries festival in Cannes. He appeared in Cédric Jimenez's 2022 film Novembre.

Personal life
As of 2020, Outalbali resides in Paris.

Filmography

Film

Television

Music videos

Awards and nominations

References

External links
 
 

1999 births
Living people
French male film actors
French male television actors
21st-century French male actors